MŠK Žilina is a Slovak football club based in the town of Žilina, that is playing in the Slovak Superliga. Since the league inception in 1993, the club has won 7 titles and comes second in All-time table that makes them one of the most successful teams in the competition.
The club and their supporters alike are nicknamed Šošoni (after the Shoshone Native American tribe) and play their home games in the Štadión pod Dubňom. In the 2016–17 season, Žilina won the Slovak League.

History

Early years
The club was founded towards the end of 1908 under the Hungarian name Zsolnai Testgyakorlók Köre, and was officially registered on 20 June 1909. The club won its first Slovak championship (Zväzové majstrovstvá Slovenska) in 1928 followed by another in 1929.

Czechoslovak League
In total, Žilina played 30 out of 47 seasons in the Czechoslovak First League spanning from 1945 to 1993 and come 13th in all-time table. The most successful season remains 1946–47 when they clinched 4th place.

Many consider 1961 a milestone in club's history. Firstly, the team reached the final of the National Cup, where they lost to Dukla Prague, the eventual Czechoslovak champion. Despite the defeat, for the first time in its history the club, then known as Dynamo Žilina, broke into Europe to contest in the UEFA Cup Winners' Cup. Notable 3–2 and 1–0 victories over Olympiacos moved them in quarter-finals, however the ambitious Slovak team was ultimately knocked out by the previous year's winner Fiorentina. Although Žilina grabbed a promising 3–2 victory at home, Fiorentina went through by winning the second leg 2–0.

 Quarter-Finals

First leg

Second leg

Fiorentina won 4–3 on aggregate.

In the late 1960s the club was renamed TJ ZVL Žilina and participated in the Intertoto Cup for several years, winning the group in 1969 and coming 2nd a year later. In 1973–74 they reached the final of the Mitropa Cup but they were defeated by Tatabányai Bányász 5–2 on aggregate. Between 1972 and 1974, they finished 5th in the First Division of the Czechoslovak League for three years running, followed by relegation to the Second Division in the 1978–79 season. The club bounced back four years later and finished second in the Mitropa Cup.

New era – Slovak League
Following dissolution of Czechoslovakia in 1993, MŠK Žilina has been playing in the Slovak Superliga for the total of 23 seasons with the exception of 1995–96 season after relegation to the Second Division.

In the autumn of 2000, former Czechoslovakian defender Ladislav Jurkemik joined the club as a new manager. After his departure halfway through the 2001–02 season the club appointed Czech coach Leoš Kalvoda. During his short reign at the club he led them to win their first title. In the 2002–03 season, now under the management of Milan Lešický, the club succeeded in retaining the title.

Ladislav Jurkemik was reappointed as a manager during the 2003–04 season. He led the defending champions to 10 priceless consecutive victories to clinch the third successive title though narrowly on a goal difference.
After Slovan Bratislava, MŠK Žilina became only the second club to win three Slovakian titles.
The team's performances in next two seasons faded while they lacked the quality they had been famous for during their winning campaigns. In pursuit of silverware numerous players were signed over next two years. In the span of only fourteen months, three managers; the reputable Karol Pecze, his successor Milan Nemec and eventually Marijan Vlak were in charge over the team. Since the results and performances never met the expectations, Vlak ended his reign immediately at the end of 2005–06 season after they failed to reach UEFA Cup spot only to finish fourth.

They played in the 2008–09 UEFA Cup, reaching the group stages where they beat Aston Villa 2–1 at Villa Park.

Former Czechoslovakia and later Czech international Pavel Hapal was appointed new manager before 2009–10 campaign. In his first season, he led the team to win a league title, their fifth in nine years. Arguably the greatest success in their history came by making a debut in 2010–11 UEFA Champions League group stage after eliminating Sparta Prague in play-off round. In the following season they completed their first ever double, while the 2012–13 season saw the team finishing 7th – their worst league position since 2000. However, as a defeated finalists of the Slovak Cup the club secured a place to contest in the 1st qualifying round of 2013–14 UEFA Europa League.

League finishing positions

Events timeline
 1909 – Founded as Zsolnai Testgyakorlók Köre
 1910 – Renamed ZsTS Zsolna
 1919 – Renamed SK Žilina
 1948 – Renamed Sokol Slovena Žilina
 1953 – Renamed Jiskra Slovena Žilina
 1956 – Renamed DSO Dynamo Žilina
 1961 – First European qualification, 1961–62
 1963 – Renamed Jednota Žilina
 1967 – Renamed TJ ZVL Žilina
 1990 – Renamed ŠK Žilina
 1995 – Renamed MŠK Žilina

Affiliated clubs
The following clubs are currently affiliated with MŠK Žilina:
  Tatran Liptovský Mikuláš (2012–present)
  MŠK Námestovo (TBA–present)
  Baník Prievidza (2013–present)
  JUPIE Futbalová škola Mareka Hamšíka (2016–present)
  MŠK Žilina Africa FC (2018–present)

Supporters
MŠK Žilina supporters are called Žilinskí Šošoni (Žilina Shoshones), North Brigade and Žilinskí Fanatici (Žilina Fanatics). Žilina supporters maintain friendly relations with fans of Polish Góral Żywiec

Stadium

Štadión Pod Dubňom is their home stadium. It has a capacity of 11,181. It underwent a major renovation since 2006. Between 2014 and 2015 it was used as the home stadium of Slovakia.

Sponsorship
source

Honours

Domestic
 Czechoslovakia
 Zväzové Majstrovstvá Slovenska (Slovak League) (1925–33)
  Winners: 1928, 1929
 Czechoslovak Cup (1961–93)
  Runners-up: 1961
 1.SNL (1st Slovak National football league) (1969–93)
  Winners: 1981–82
 Slovakia
 Slovak Super Liga (1993–present)
  Winners (7): 2001–02, 2002–03, 2003–04, 2006–07, 2009–10, 2011–12, 2016–17
  Runners-up (5): 2004–05, 2007–08, 2008–09, 2014–15, 2019–20
 Slovak Cup (1961–present)
  Winners (2): 1960–61, 2011–12
  Runners-up (8): 1976–77, 1979–80, 1985–86, 1989–90, 2010–11, 2012–13, 2018–19, 2020–21
 Pribina Cup (Slovak Super Cup) (1993–present)
  Winners: 2003, 2004, 2007, 2010

Slovak League Top Goalscorer
Slovak League Top scorer since 1993–94

1Shared award

European
 UEFA Cup Winners' Cup
 Quarter-final (1): 1961–62
 Mitropa Cup
  Runners-up (2): 1974, 1983

UEFA ranking
This is the current 2021–22 UEFA coefficient:

Full list

Transfers
MŠK have produced numerous players who have gone on to represent the Slovak national football team. Over the last period there has been a steady increase of young players leaving Žilina after a few years of first team football and moving on to play football in leagues of a higher standard, with the German Bundesliga (Double best scorer Marek Mintál to 1. FC Nürnberg in 2003, another forwards Stanislav Šesták to VfL Bochum in 2009 and Mário Breška to 1. FC Nürnberg in 2008, also right back Peter Pekarík to VfL Wolfsburg in 2009), Italian Serie A (Milan Škriniar to Sampdoria in 2016, Dávid Hancko to ACF Fiorentina in 2018), Spanish La Liga (Róbert Mazáň to Celta de Vigo in 2018), Turkish Süper Lig (William to Kayserispor in 2016), Dutch Eredivisie (Róbert Boženík to Feyenoord in 2020), Danish Superliga (Denis Vavro to F.C. Copenhagen in 2017, Dawid Kurminowski to AGK in 2021), Austrian Football Bundesliga (Admir Vladavić to Salzburg in 2009 and 2013–14 best goalscorer Matej Jelić to Rapid Wien in 2015), Polish Ekstraklasa (Ján Mucha to Legia Warsaw in 2005, Róbert Jež to Górnik Zabrze in 2010 and Vahan Bichakhchyan to Pogoń Szczecin in 2022). Russian Premier League (Tomáš Hubočan to Zenit in 2008).
The top transfer was agreed in 2016 when 18 years old talented midfielder László Bénes joined German Mönchengladbach for a fee more than €5.0 million, which was the highest ever paid to a Slovak club.

Record transfers

*-unofficial fee

Players

Current squad
Updated 9 February 2023

For recent transfers, see List of Slovak football transfers winter 2022-23.

Out on loan

Reserve team
MŠK Žilina B are the reserve team of MŠK Žilina. They currently play in the second-level football league in Slovakia 2. Liga.

Squad

Head coach:  Vladimír Veselý

Assistant coach:  Filip Kňazovič

Assistant coach:  Viktor Pečovský

Goalkeeper coach:  Dušan Molčan

For recent transfers, see List of Slovak football transfers winter 2022–23.

Staff

Results

League and Cup history

Slovak League only (1993–present)
{|class="wikitable"
! style="color:#FBE100; background:#00502E;"| Season
! style="color:#FBE100; background:#00502E;"| Division (Name)
! style="color:#FBE100; background:#00502E;"| Pos./Teams
! style="color:#FBE100; background:#00502E;"| Pl.
! style="color:#FBE100; background:#00502E;"| W
! style="color:#FBE100; background:#00502E;"| D
! style="color:#FBE100; background:#00502E;"| L
! style="color:#FBE100; background:#00502E;"| GS
! style="color:#FBE100; background:#00502E;"| GA
! style="color:#FBE100; background:#00502E;"| P
! style="color:#FBE100; background:#00502E;"|Slovak Cup
! style="color:#FBE100; background:#00502E;" colspan=2|Europe
! style="color:#FBE100; background:#00502E;"|Top Scorer (Goals)
|-
|align=center|1993–94
|align=center|1st (Mars Superliga)
|align=center|5/(12)
|align=center|32
|align=center|11
|align=center|11
|align=center|10
|align=center|50
|align=center|42
|align=center|33
|align=center|3.R
|align=center|
|align=center|
|align=center| Ivan Šefčík (13)   Ľubomír Zuziak (13)
|-
|align=center|1994–95
|align=center|1st(Mars Superliga)
|align=center bgcolor=red|12/(12)
|align=center|32
|align=center|9
|align=center|3
|align=center|20
|align=center|37
|align=center|53
|align=center|30
|align=center|1.R
|align=center|
|align=center|
|align=center|
|-
|-
|align=center|1995–96
|align=center|2nd (1.Liga)
|align=center bgcolor=green|2/(16) (P)
|align=center|30
|align=center|17
|align=center|5
|align=center|8
|align=center|57
|align=center|27
|align=center|56
|align=center|2.R
|align=center|
|align=center|
|align=center|
|-
|align=center|1996–97
|align=center|1st (Mars Superliga)
|align=center|9/(16)
|align=center|30
|align=center|11
|align=center|4
|align=center|15
|align=center|30
|align=center|34
|align=center|37
|align=center|2.R
|align=center|
|align=center|
|align=center|
|-
|align=center|1997–98
|align=center|1st (Mars Superliga)
|align=center|7/(16)
|align=center|30
|align=center|11
|align=center|9
|align=center|10
|align=center|23
|align=center|25
|align=center|42
|align=center|1.R
|align=center|UI
|align=center| Group stage (9), 4th
|align=center|  Ladislav Meszároš (5)
|-
|align=center|1998–99
|align=center|1st (Mars Superliga)
|align=center|6/(16)
|align=center|30
|align=center|15
|align=center|3
|align=center|12
|align=center|36
|align=center|42
|align=center|48
|align=center|2.R
|align=center|
|align=center|
|align=center|  Marek Mintál (11)
|-
|align=center|1999–00
|align=center|1st (Mars Superliga)
|align=center|8/(16)
|align=center|30
|align=center|12
|align=center|5
|align=center|13
|align=center|39
|align=center|37
|align=center|41
|align=center|1.R
|align=center| UI
|align=center|2.R ( Metz)
|align=center|  Marek Mintál (12)
|-
|align=center|2000–01
|align=center|1st (Mars Superliga)
|align=center|5/(10)
|align=center|36
|align=center|11
|align=center|12
|align=center|13
|align=center|41
|align=center|46
|align=center|45
|align=center|2.R
|align=center|
|align=center|
|align=center|  Ľubomír Reiter (12) 
|-
|align=center|2001–02
|align=center|1st (Mars Superliga)
|align=center bgcolor=gold|1/(10)
|align=center|36
|align=center|21
|align=center|6
|align=center|9
|align=center|62
|align=center|39
|align=center|69
|align=center|Semi-finals
|align=center|
|align=center|
|align=center|  Marek Mintál (21)
|-
|align=center|2002–03
|align=center|1st (Slovak Super Liga)
|align=center bgcolor=gold|1/(10)
|align=center|36
|align=center|21
|align=center|7
|align=center|8
|align=center|69
|align=center|31
|align=center|70
|align=center|Semi-finals
|align=center|CL
|align=center|Q2 ( Basel)
|align=center| Marek Mintál (20)
|-
|align=center|2003–04
|align=center|1st (Corgoň Liga)
|align=center bgcolor=gold|1/(10)
|align=center|36
|align=center|17
|align=center|13
|align=center|6
|align=center|62
|align=center|35
|align=center|64
|align=center|Quarter-finals
|align=center|CL  UC
|align=center|Q3 ( Chelsea)  1R ( FC Utrecht)
|align=center| Marek Bažík (11)
|-
|align=center|2004–05
|align=center|1st (Corgoň Liga)
|align=center bgcolor=silver|2/(10)
|align=center|36
|align=center|19
|align=center|8
|align=center|9
|align=center|73
|align=center|34
|align=center|65
|align=center|Semi-finals
|align=center|CL
|align=center|Q2 ( D.București)
|align=center|  Ivan Bartoš (18)
|-
|align=center|2005–06
|align=center|1st (Corgoň Liga)
|align=center|4/(10)
|align=center|36
|align=center|18
|align=center|6
|align=center|12
|align=center|69
|align=center|44
|align=center|60
|align=center|2.R
|align=center|UC
|align=center|Q2 ( Austria Wien)
|align=center|  Stanislav Šesták (17)
|-
|align=center|2006–07
|align=center|1st (Corgoň Liga)
|align=center bgcolor=gold|1/(12)
|align=center|28
|align=center|22
|align=center|3
|align=center|3
|align=center|80
|align=center|17
|align=center|69
|align=center|Quarter-finals
|align=center|
|align=center|
|align=center|  Stanislav Šesták (15)
|-
|align=center|2007–08
|align=center|1st (Corgoň Liga)
|align=center bgcolor=silver|2/(12)
|align=center|33
|align=center|22
|align=center|4
|align=center|4
|align=center|75
|align=center|30
|align=center|73
|align=center|Semi-finals
|align=center|CL
|align=center|Q2 ( Slavia Prague)
|align=center|  Peter Štyvar (15)
|-
|align=center|2008–09
|align=center|1st (Corgoň Liga)
|align=center bgcolor=silver|2/(12)
|align=center|33
|align=center|18
|align=center|8
|align=center|7
|align=center|56
|align=center|26
|align=center|62
|align=center|Quarter-finals
|align=center|UC
|align=center| Group stage (F), 4th
|align=center|  Adauto (11)
|-
|align=center|2009–10
|align=center|1st (Corgoň Liga)
|align=center bgcolor=gold|1/(12)
|align=center|33
|align=center|23
|align=center|4
|align=center|6
|align=center|59
|align=center|17
|align=center|73
|align=center|3.R
|align=center|EL
|align=center|P-O ( FK Partizan)
|align=center|  Ivan Lietava (13)
|-
|align=center|2010–11
|align=center|1st (Corgoň Liga)
|align=center bgcolor=tan|3/(12)
|align=center|33
|align=center|14
|align=center|12
|align=center|7
|align=center|47
|align=center|28
|align=center|54
|align=center bgcolor=silver|Runners-up
|align=center|CL
|align=center|Group stage (F), 4th
|align=center|  Tomáš Majtán (11)   Tomáš Oravec (11)
|-
|align=center|2011–12
|align=center|1st (Corgoň Liga)
|align=center bgcolor=gold|1/(12)
|align=center|33
|align=center|19
|align=center|10
|align=center|4
|align=center|57
|align=center|27
|align=center|67
|align=center bgcolor=gold|Winner
|align=center| EL
|align=center|Q2 ( KR)
|align=center|  Róbert Pich (10)
|-
|align=center|2012–13
|align=center|1st (Corgoň Liga)
|align=center|7/(12)
|align=center|33
|align=center|9
|align=center|15
|align=center|9
|align=center|37
|align=center|28
|align=center|42
|align=center bgcolor=silver|Runners-up
|align=center|CL
|align=center|Q2 ( I.K.Shmona)
|align=center|  Róbert Pich (11) 
|-
|align=center|2013–14
|align=center|1st (Corgoň Liga)
|align=center|9/(12)
|align=center|33
|align=center|11
|align=center|7
|align=center|15
|align=center|49
|align=center|50
|align=center|40
|align=center|Quarter-finals
|align=center|EL
|align=center|Q3 ( HNK Rijeka)
|align=center|  Róbert Pich (7)
|-
|align=center|2014–15
|align=center|1st (Fortuna Liga)
|align=center bgcolor=silver|2/(12)
|align=center|33
|align=center|20
|align=center|9
|align=center|4
|align=center|68
|align=center|25
|align=center|69
|align=center|5.R
|align=center|
|align=center|
|align=center|  Matej Jelić (19)
|-
|align=center|2015–16
|align=center|1st (Fortuna Liga)
|align=center|5/(12)
|align=center|33
|align=center|14
|align=center|6
|align=center|13
|align=center|58
|align=center|46
|align=center|48
|align=center|Semi-finals
|align=center| EL
|align=center|P-O ( Athletic Bilbao)
|align=center|  Nermin Haskić (8)
|-
|align=center|2016–17
|align=center|1st (Fortuna Liga)
|align=center bgcolor=gold|1/(12)
|align=center|30
|align=center|23
|align=center|4
|align=center|3
|align=center|82
|align=center|25
|align=center|73
|align=center|Quarter-finals
|align=center| 
|align=center|
|align=center|  Filip Hlohovský (20)
|-
|align=center|2017–18
|align=center|1st (Fortuna Liga)
|align=center|4/(12)
|align=center|31
|align=center|17
|align=center|2
|align=center|12
|align=center|61
|align=center|48
|align=center|53
|align=center|Semi–finals
|align=center| CL
|align=center| Q2 ( Copenhagen)
|align=center|  Samuel Mráz (21)
|-
|align=center|2018–19
|align=center|1st (Fortuna Liga)
|align=center|4/(12)
|align=center|32
|align=center|16
|align=center|6
|align=center|10
|align=center|56
|align=center|44
|align=center|54
|align=center bgcolor=silver|Runners-up
|align=center| 
|align=center| 
|align=center|   Róbert Boženík (13)
|-
|align=center|2019–20
|align=center|1st (Fortuna Liga)
|align=center bgcolor=silver|2/(12)
|align=center|27
|align=center|15
|align=center|6
|align=center|6
|align=center|48
|align=center|25
|align=center|51
|align=center|1/8 Fin
|align=center| 
|align=center| 
|align=center|   Ján Bernát (9)
|-
|align=center|2020–21
|align=center|1st (Fortuna Liga)
|align=center|4/(12)
|align=center|32
|align=center|15
|align=center|7
|align=center|10
|align=center|73
|align=center|52
|align=center|52
|align=center bgcolor=silver|Runners-up
|align=center| EL
|align=center| Q1 ( New Saints)
|align=center|  Dawid Kurminowski (20)
|-
|align=center|2021–22
|align=center|1st (Fortuna Liga)
|align=center|6/(12)
|align=center|32
|align=center|8
|align=center|10
|align=center|14
|align=center|43
|align=center|52
|align=center|34
|align=center|Quarter-finals
|align=center| ECL
|align=center| P–O ( FK Jablonec)
|align=center|  Vahan Bichakhchyan (6)
|}

European competition

European record 
Updated 26 August 2021

Player records

Most goals

Players whose name is listed in bold are still active.

Notable players 
Had international caps for their respective countries. Players whose name is listed in bold represented their countries while playing for MŠK.

Past (and present) players who are the subjects of Wikipedia articles can be found here.

List of MŠK Žilina managers

   István Priboj (1935 - 1936)
  Antal Mally (1946 - 1949)
  Anton Bulla (1961 - 1962)
  Štefan Jačiansky
  Oldřich Šubrt (1967)
  Vojtech Schottert (1967 - 1968)
  Arnošt Hložek (1968 – 1969)
  Teodor Reiman (1970 – 1973)
  Jozef Marušin (1973)
  Michal Baránek (1974 – 1975)
  Jozef Marko (1975 – 1977)
  Eduard Hančin (1977 – 1978)
  Michal Pucher (1978)
  Karol Pecze (1979 – 1981)
  Viliam Meissner (1981 – 1982)
  Kamil Majerník (1982 – 1984)
  Emil Bezdeda (1984 – 1985)
  Jozef Jankech (1985 – 1987)
  Albert Rusnák (1987 – 1988)
  Vladimír Židek (1988)
  Karel Brückner (1988 – 1989)
  Oldřich Sedláček (1989 – 1991)
  Jozef Zigo (1991 – 1993)
  Miroslav Kráľ (1994)
  Štefan Slezák (1994 – 1995)
  Jozef Zigo (1995)
  Stanislav Griga (1995 – 1996)
  Dušan Radolský (1996 – 1997)
  Anton Jánoš (1998 – 1999)
  Jozef Barmoš (1999 – 2000)
  Miroslav Turianik (2000)
  Ladislav Jurkemik (2000 – 2001)
  Leoš Kalvoda (2002)
  František Komňacký (2002)
  Jaroslav Rybár (2003)
  Milan Lešický (2003)
  Juraj Šimurka (2003)
  Ladislav Jurkemik (2004 – 2005)
  Karol Pecze (2005)
  Milan Nemec (2005 – 2005)
  Marijan Vlak (2006)
  Pavel Vrba (2006 – 2008)
  Dušan Radolský (2008 – 2009)
  Vladimir Kutka (2009)
  Pavel Hapal (2009 – 2011)
  Ľubomír Nosický (2011 – 2012)
  Frans Adelaar (2012 – 2013)
  Štefan Tarkovič (2013)
  Adrián Guľa (2013 – 2018)
  Jaroslav Kentoš (2018 – 2019)
  Pavol Staňo (2020 – 2021)
  Peter Černák (10/2021 – 03/2022)
  Ivan Belák (03/2022 – 05/2022) (Carateker)
  Jaroslav Hynek (06/2022 – present)

References

External links
 Official website

 
MSK Zilina
Football clubs in Slovakia
Czechoslovak First League clubs
Association football clubs established in 1908
MSK Zilina
Sport in Žilina Region